= Magnetic spin vortex disc =

Magnetic material synthesis and characterization technology continue to improve, allowing for the production of various shapes, sizes, and compositions of magnetic material to be studied and tuned for improved properties. One of the places which has seen great advancement is in the synthesis of magnetic materials at nanometer length scales. Nanoparticle research has seen a great deal of interest in a number of fields as many phenomena can be explained by what is occurring on the nanoscale, which can be probed more effectively using nanometer sized materials. One unique type of materials which have seen a recent surge in research interest have been known as "nanoflakes" where they resemble flakes or discs of nanometer thickness and micrometer dimensions. Nanomaterials of this shape have seen use in a number of fields including energy storage, as [electrodes] of electrochemical cells, and in cancer therapy to kill cancer cells.
